Pamela Gaye Walker is an American actress, writer, director, and producer for film and theatre. She is a member of Actors' Equity Association (AEA), and Screen Actors Guild/American Federation of Radio and Television Artists (SAG-AFTRA). She is the founder and President of Ghost Ranch Productions. She is known for Shakti's Retreat (2013) and Trifles (2009).

Walker married stage/film producer John Walker on December 5, 1981. Professionally, John and Pamela starred together in over twenty shows at The Peninsula Players Theatre in Door County, Wisconsin. Her marriage proposal took place onstage there, after the opening night performance of Children of a Lesser God.

In Chicago,  Walker worked and taught acting at Victory Gardens Theater, where she played Georgie in Theresa Rebeck's Spike Heels and the Chicago Tribune'''s review said, "she's a sharp, funny, delightful comic actress, and she anchors the production in warmth, grace, spontaneity and beauty." She was also in Murder in Green Meadows by Doug Post, and Claudia Allen's Hannah Free, which garnered her the Actress of the Year Award from the Academy of Theatre Artists and Friends. Walker also received a nomination by the Joseph Jefferson Award committee for Outstanding Achievement by a Principal Actress in a Play for her work in Sea Marks at The Royal George Theater.

One of her most highly acclaimed roles was as Georgia O'Keeffe in the two-person play, Alfred Stieglitz Loves O'Keeffe, based on the volatile love and artistic relationship between  painter Georgia O'Keeffe and photographer Alfred Stieglitz.

Critical reviews of Walker's work include:Backstage: "Walker beautifully conveys O’Keeffe’s inner turmoil, self-centeredness and eroticism...volatile, sensuous, playful, withholding and insecure..."Pasadena Weekly: "Walker and Ortlieb bring the lovers to life.  Alone, each performer is formidable.  Together, the play leaps off the stage and into the stratosphere."

Walker worked as an actor with Theatreworks in Donald Margulies' Brooklyn Boy, at the Magic Theatre in Theresa Rebeck's world premiere of What We're Up Against, and in two plays for the Aurora Theatre – Ibsen's John Gabriel Borkman and Amy Herzog's After the Revolution. Most recently, in May 2015, Pamela starred with her husband, John, in the world premiere of Empty Nester by Garrett Jon Groenveld.

 Early life 
Walker grew up in South Bend, Indiana; she has a twin sister (Patricia) and three older brothers. Her father suffered a stroke when Pamela and her sister were three years old.

 Career 

 Theatrical studies and early career 
Finishing her undergraduate work at the University of Notre Dame, Walker majored in theatre, where she starred as Winnie in Samuel Beckett's two-character play Happy Days. It was at Notre Dame that she met her future husband, fellow actor and eventual theatre and film producer John Walker.  They performed together in Brecht's Caucasian Chalk Circle, You Can't Take it with You, Fiddler on the Roof, Molière's Imaginary Invalid, Barefoot in the Park, Treasure Island'', among other plays.

After graduation, Walker trained in New York at Broadway's Circle In The Square Theatre Conservatory, where her teachers included Larry Moss (The Intent to Live), acting coach to Helen Hunt and Hilary Swank; Michael Kahn (The Acting Company); Jacqueline Brookes (Broadway actress); and Nikos Psacharopoulos (Artistic Director, Williamstown Theatre Festival).

Theatre credits

Television and film credits

Awards and nominations

References

External links 
 

Actresses from Indiana
Ball State University alumni
Living people
People from South Bend, Indiana
Vincennes University alumni
University of Notre Dame alumni
Year of birth missing (living people)
21st-century American women